Caridina ensifera is a freshwater shrimp from Sulawesi. It is one of the 11 species of Caridina endemic to Lake Poso. It lives on a variety of substrates, including wood, rocks, sand and macrophytes, but is also found in pelagic swarms. It is suspected to only live in shallow water.

References

Atyidae
Freshwater crustaceans of Asia
Endemic freshwater shrimp of Sulawesi
Crustaceans described in 1902